Abu Aiah Koroma (26 November 1928 – 6 March 2005) was a lawyer and politician in Sierra Leone. Koroma began his political career as Attorney General in 1967 and 1968. He returned to government in 1976 when he became Managing Director of the National Diamond Mining Company until 1987. In 1991 and 1992, Koroma was the Minister of Mineral Resources. In 1996, he ran as the presidential candidate of the Democratic Centre Party and gained just 4.9% of the national vote in the initial round of voting. After Ahmed Tejan Kabbah won the presidency, Koroma was named Minister of Political and Parliamentary Affairs, which lasted until Kabbah's re-election in 2002. Koroma died in 2005 at the age of 76.

Government ministers of Sierra Leone
1928 births
2005 deaths
Attorneys-general of Sierra Leone
People from Koidu
Fourah Bay College alumni